The Best Olympian, Women's Sports ESPY Award formerly known as the Best U.S. Female Olympian ESPY Award has been presented annually since 2009 to the sportswoman or team affiliated with the United States Olympic Committee and contesting sport internationally adjudged to be the best.  The award serves in practice to replace the Best Female Olympic Performance ESPY Award, which was presented in 2005, and the Best U.S. Olympian ESPY Award presented in 2006.

Balloting for the award is undertaken by fans over the Internet from amongst between three and five choices selected by the ESPN Select Nominating Committee, and the award is conferred in June to reflect performance and achievement over the twelve months previous.

List of winners

See also

 List of sports awards honoring women
 USOC Athlete of the Year
 United States at the Olympics
 United States Olympic & Paralympic Hall of Fame
 Best U.S. Male Olympian ESPY Award

References

ESPY Awards
United States at the Olympics
Women's sports in the United States
Sports awards honoring women
Awards established in 2009
2009 establishments in the United States